Gerard Valentín Sancho (born 28 July 1993) is a Spanish professional footballer who plays as either a right back or a right winger for SD Huesca.

Club career
Born in Avinyonet de Puigventós, Girona, Catalonia, Valentín graduated with Girona FC's youth setup, after a stint at UE Figueres. He made his debuts as a senior with Sevilla FC C in the 2012–13 campaign, in Tercera División.

On 13 July 2013, Valentín joined Segunda División B side UE Olot. On 6 July of the following year, after appearing regularly, he signed a two-year deal fellow league team Gimnàstic de Tarragona.

Valentín appeared in 24 matches for Nàstic during the campaign, winning promotion to Segunda División. He made his professional debut on 23 August, starting in a 2–2 home draw against Albacete Balompié.

On 18 January 2016, Valentín renewed his contract until 2019. On 12 July of the following year, he signed a four-year deal with La Liga side Deportivo de La Coruña.

Valentín made his top tier debut on 30 September 2017, replacing Juanfran in a 2–1 home defeat of Getafe CF. However, he featured rarely as his side suffered relegation.

On 15 January 2019, Valentín was loaned to CD Lugo in the second division, for six months. On 12 August, his loan was extended for the 2019–20 campaign.

On 14 September 2020, after Dépors relegation, Valentín agreed to a permanent two-year contract with Lugo. On 27 January 2022, he moved to fellow second division side SD Huesca on a four-and-a-half-year deal.

International career
On 28 December 2016, Valentín made his debut for the Catalonia national football team, coming on as a half-time substitute for Pol Lirola in a 3–3 draw against Tunisia (2–4 penalty loss).

Personal life
Valentín's younger brother, Pol, is also a footballer and a right back. He was also groomed at Figueres. Their father Albert was also a right back, and also played for Figueres.

References

External links

1993 births
Living people
People from Alt Empordà
Sportspeople from the Province of Girona
Spanish footballers
Footballers from Catalonia
Association football defenders
Association football wingers
La Liga players
Segunda División players
Segunda División B players
Tercera División players
Sevilla FC C players
UE Olot players
Gimnàstic de Tarragona footballers
Deportivo de La Coruña players
CD Lugo players
SD Huesca footballers
Catalonia international footballers